Seth Maury is an American visual effects artist. He was nominated for an Academy Award in the category Best Visual Effects for the film Mulan.

Selected filmography 
 Mulan (2020; co-nominated with Sean Andrew Faden, Anders Langlands and Steve Ingram)

References

External links 

Living people
Place of birth missing (living people)
Year of birth missing (living people)
Visual effects artists
Visual effects supervisors